Bloch is a surname of German origin. Notable people with this surname include:

A–F
 (1859-1914), French rabbi
Adele Bloch-Bauer (1881-1925), Austrian entrepreneur
Albert Bloch (1882–1961), American painter
 (born 1972), German motor journalist and presenter
 (1878–?), Russian lawyer, journalist, lawyer, and revolutionary 
Alexandre Bloch (1857–1919), French painter
Alfred Bloch (born 1877), French footballer
 (1915–1983), Swiss linguist
 (1904–1979), German-British engineer
Aliza Bloch (born 1957), First female mayor of Bet Shemesh, Israel
 (1768–1838), Swiss Benedictine monk
André Bloch (composer) (1873–1960), French composer and music educator
André Bloch (mathematician) (1893–1948), French mathematician
 (1914–1942), French agent of the Special Operations Executive
Andreas Bloch (1860–1917), Norwegian painter, illustrator and costume designer
Andy Bloch (born 1969), American poker player
Anna Bloch (1868–1953), Danish actress
Armand Bloch (1866–1932), French sculptor
 (1865–1952), French-German rabbi and author.
Arthur Bloch (born 1948), American writer, author of Murphy's Law
 (1882–1942), victim of a massacre of Jews in Switzerland
 (born 1992), Polish e-sportsman 
 (1876–1949), German landscape painter
 (Abraham) (1780 or 1781–1866), German merchant and president of the Prussian Seehandlung
Augustyn Bloch (1929–2006), Polish composer and organist
Avraham Yitzchak Bloch (1891–1941), Lithuanian rabbi
Bernard Bloch (linguist) (1907–1965), American linguist
Bernard Bloch (actor), (born 1949) French actor
Bianca Bloch (1848–1901), German author
 (born 1951), Russian-Ukrainian pianist and conductor
 (1878–1933), Swiss dermatologist and university professor
 (1891–1970), Swiss chocolate producer
Carl Heinrich Bloch, (1834–1890), Danish painter
Chaim Yitzchak Bloch Hacohen (1867–1948), Lithuanian-American rabbi
 (1881–1973), Ukrainian-Romanian writer
 (1921–1987), French historian
Charles E. Bloch (1861–1940), American publisher
 (1908–1988), German Resistance member
Claude Bloch (1923–1971), French theoretical nuclear physicist
 (born 1928), survivor of the Jewish genocide
Claude C. Bloch (1878–1967), American naval admiral
 (born 1959), Israeli-Swiss actress, director, theater pedagogue, and respiratory therapist 
Darius Paul Bloch, birthname of Darius Paul Dassault (1882–1969), French Army general of Jewish origin, who adopted "Dassault" as nom de guerre during French Resistance service
 (born 1938), French engineer and physicist 
David Bloch-Blumenfeld (1880–1947), Israeli politician
 (1910–2002), German painter
Débora Bloch (born 1963), Brazilian actress
Denise Bloch (1916-1945), French Resistance member
Dora Bloch, Israeli-British citizen murdered in 1976  
Dorete Bloch (1943–2015), Danish zoologist
Eduard Bloch (1872–1945), Austrian physician and family doctor of Adolf Hitler from 1903 to 1907
 (1831–1895), German theater book dealer and author
 (1881–1943), Ukrainian and Soviet sculptor, artist, and teacher
 (1909–1943), French rabbi and Resistance member 
Elisa Bloch (1848-1905), Silesian-French sculptor
Emanuel Hirsch Bloch (1902–1954), American lawyer
 (1897–1994), German writer
Ernest Bloch (1880–1959), Swiss-born American composer
Ernst Bloch (1885–1977), German philosopher
Erich Bloch (1925–2016), American electrical engineer and administrator
 (1921–2009), French magistrate and Resistance member
Eugene Bloch (1878–1944), French physicist and professor 
France Bloch-Sérazin (1913–1943), French Resistance member during World War II
Felix Bloch (1905–1983), Swiss physicist
Felix Bloch (diplomatic officer) (born 1935), American diplomat accused of spying for the Soviets
 (1864–1945), Austrian-Czech sugar manufacturer and art lover
 (1916–2005), French literary critic
 (1912–2002), French politicians and administrative professionals of the postwar period
 (1917–2010), German manager
 (1904–1996), Lord Mayor of the city of Gera from 1945 to 1948
 (1889–1942), German mining engineer

G–L
Grete Bloch (1892–1944), German industrial employee, letter partner of Franz Kafka
 (1871–1938), Soviet otorhinolaryngologist and phthisiologist
Gustave Bloch (1848–1923), French Jewish historian of ancient history
 (born 1953), German cynologist and author 
 (1881–1914), German painter and art teacher
Hans Glad Bloch (1791–1865), Norwegian politician
 (born 1936), German radio play author
Harriet Bloch (1881–1975), Danish first female film screenwriter
Heinz P. Bloch, American mechanical engineer
Henry W. Bloch (1922–2019), American businessman and Kansas City philanthropist.
Herbert Bloch (1911–2006), German archaeologist and epigrapher
Herbert J. Bloch (1907–1987), philatelist of New York City
Herman S. Bloch (1912–1990), American chemist and an inventor
 (1867–1929), German historian, university teacher, and politician (DVP)
 (1878–1942), German chemist
Immanuel Bloch (born 1972), German experimental physicist
Isaac Bloch, French rabbi
 (1888–1958), Belarusian scientist
 (1889–1955), arrived in Palestine during the Second Aliyah
 (1730–1798), German rabbi
Iwan Bloch (1872–1922), Berlin dermatologist
Jacqueline Bloch (born 1967), French physicist
Jan Gotlib Bloch (1836–1902), also known as Ivan Bloch, Polish banker and warfare expert
 (1937–2010), German natural scientist, educator, and social philosopher 
 (born 1946), French policeman
 (1858–1916), French singer
Jean-Richard Bloch (1884–1947), French writer
 (1906–1945), German jurist
 (1919–1979), Israeli Jewish religious scholar
Jonas Bloch (1939), Brazilian actor 
 (1875–1970), French Rabbi
 (1871–1936), German Social Democratic publicist
Joseph Samuel Bloch (1850–1923), Austrian rabbi
Joshua Bloch (1961), American software engineer
Joshua Bloch (rabbi) (1890–1957), Lithuanian-American rabbi and librarian
Jules Bloch (1880–1953), French linguist
Julia Chang Bloch (born 1942), American diplomat
Karola Bloch (1905–1994), Polish-German architect, socialist, and feminist
Konrad Emil Bloch (1912–2000), American biochemist
Kurt Bloch (born 1960), American musician
Lars Bloch (1938–2022), Danish actor and producer
 (born 1971), Russian Jazz saxophonist
 (1864–1920), German alto-philologist, classical archaeologist, and teacher
Lloyd Bloch, a fictional character
Lucienne Bloch (1909–1999), artist and photographer, daughter of Ernest Bloch

M–Z
Marc Bloch (1886–1944), French historian
Marcel Bloch, later Marcel Dassault (1892–1986), French aircraft industrialist, founder of the firm Société des Avions Marcel Bloch; he adopted his younger brother's (Darius Paul Bloch) nom de guerre
 (1882–1966), French painter, lithographer, aquafortist, pastellist, portraitist, and illustrator
 (1884–1953), French painter and sculptor
Marcus Elieser Bloch (1723–1799), German medical doctor and naturalist
 (1871–1944), German teacher and member of the bourgeois women's movement
Marjorie Bloch (born 1956), Irish painter
Mark Bloch (linguist) (1924–2022), Russian linguist
Mark Bloch (artist) (born 1956), American artist
 (1883–1954), English-German painter
Maurice Bloch (born 1939), British anthropologist
Maurice Bloch (politician) (1891–1929), New York assemblyman
Meli Polishook-Bloch (born 1953), former Israeli politician 
Michael Bloch (barrister) (born 1951)
Michael Bloch (born 1953), Author and historian
 Mohammed Ibrahim Bloch (born 1949), Indian film director 
 (1815–1891), Hungarian linguist and theologian
 (1804–1841), German rabbi
Moses Löb Bloch (1815–1909), Hungarian rabbi
Moshe Rudolf Bloch (1902–1985), Israeli scientist
 (1893–1942), Lithuanian engineer, architect, educator and Zionist
Noë Bloch (1875–1937), Russian-born film producer
 (born 1959), Israeli CEO
 (1900–1945), German art historian
Orville Emil Bloch (1915–1983), American military officer and Medal of Honor recipient
 (1877–1937), French linguist and lexicographer
 (1881–1937), German architect 
Paul Bloch (c. 1940–2018), American publicist
Pedro Bloch (1914–2004), Brazilian writer
 (1900–1984), German politician (CDU)
 (1925–1994), German art historian and museum director
 (born 1936), Swiss Germanist
Peter Rafael Bloch (1921–2008), German-American art historian, writer and journalist
 (1841–1923), German historian and Reform rabbi
Pierrette Bloch (1928–2017), Swiss painter and textile artist
Ray Bloch (1902–1982), American composer, songwriter, and conductor
 (1914–1997),  French ancient historian, classical philologist and Etruscologist
 (1911–2001), French painter
 (1923–2016), French engineer
 (born 1969), Swiss Judaist and classical philologist
René Bloch (psychiatrist) (born 1937), Swiss psychiatrist and psychotherapist
 (1924–1955), French biblical pioneer of studies on targumic, midrashic, and homiletic literature 
Richard Bloch (1926–2004), American businessman
Richard L. Bloch (1929–2018), American investor, real estate developer, banker, and philanthropist
Richard Milton Bloch (1921–2000), pioneering American computer programmer
Robert Bloch (1917–1994), American writer
Robert Bloch (racing driver), French race car driver
 (1888–1942), German judge
 (1930–2015), Swiss entrepreneur 
 (born 1986), Belarusian ice hockey player
Rosa Bloch-Bollag (1880–1922), Swiss revolutionary Marxist activist 
Rosine Bloch (1844–1891), French operatic mezzo-soprano 
 (born 1966), German diplomat
Samson Bloch (1782–1845), Galician writer
Scott Bloch, American lawyer and government official
Scotty Bloch, American actress
 Sean Bloch (born 1973), South African Olympic cyclist
 (born 1956), French illustrator
Shani Bloch (born 1979), Israeli Olympic racing cyclist
 (1886–1976), Lithuanian Jew
Shmaryahu Yitzchak Bloch (c. 1862–1923), English rabbi
Sonny Bloch (c. 1937–1998), American radio show host
Spencer Bloch (born 1944), American mathematician
 (born 1971), French director and photographer 
Stella Bloch (1897–1999), American artist, dancer and journalist
Susan Bloch (1940–1982), American theatrical press agent
Suzanne Bloch (1907–2002), Swiss-American musician and an influential pioneer of Early Music Revival during the 20th century
Thomas Bloch (born 1962), French classical musician
 (born 1956), German football player
 (born 1975), French sociologist and anthropologist
Waldemar Bloch (1906–1984), Austrian composer
 (born 1943), Swiss philologist, philosopher, and writer
 (1890–1973), German politician of the SPD
 (born 1959), German sports physician and university teacher
 (1892–1968), Russian journalist, translator and publisher, theater expert
 (1913–1994), Israeli hotel manager
Yoni Bloch (born 1981), Israeli musician, songwriter, composer, rock singer, and hi-tech entrepreneur
Yosef Leib Bloch (1860–1929), Lithuanian rabbi

Named for André Bloch
Bloch space, space of holomorphic functions
Bloch's theorem (complex variables), mathematical theorem
Bloch's principle, mathematical principle

Named for Felix Bloch
Bloch oscillation, oscillation of a particle if a constant force is acting on it
Bloch spectrum, concept in quantum mechanics
Bloch sphere, geometrical representation of the pure state space of a two-level quantum mechanical system
Bloch wall, narrow transition region at the boundary between magnetic domains
Bloch function, wavefunction of a particle placed in a periodic potential

See also 
Bloch Park, baseball stadium in Selma, Alabama, United States
Bloch (company), shoe manufacturer
Bloch (TV series), German TV series

Block (disambiguation)

German-language surnames
Germanic-language surnames
Surnames of German origin
Jewish surnames
Yiddish-language surnames
Ethnonymic surnames